Advanced Manufacturing Software (AMS) is an enterprise resource planning (ERP) software product based on the Microsoft Dynamics AX platform.

The product is part of the Certified for Microsoft Dynamics family of products and is intended to assist with finance, discrete manufacturing, distribution, customer relationship management (CRM), supply chains, analytics and electronic commerce for Industrial Equipment Manufacturers, Automotive & Aerospace Manufacturers and High Tech & Electronics Manufacturers with facilities in the United States and globally. The software product is developed by I.B.I.S. Inc.

Features 
Advanced Manufacturing Software contains the following discrete manufacturing specific modules:
 Microsoft Dynamics AX Core ERP Functionality
 Lean Manufacturing
 Field Service Management & Asset Service Management
 Customer Relationship Management
 Enterprise Asset Management
 Shop Floor Integration
 Integrated Electronic Data Interchange (EDI)
 Plant Maintenance Scheduling
 Forecasting Tools 
 Financial Management
 Human Resources Management (HR)
 Product Engineering
 Project Management for Manufacturing
 Sales Estimating / Quoting
 Visual Project Planning
 Warehouse Management System (WMS)
 Warehouse inventory transfers
 Warehouse control system

References

Competition 
 Epicor
 Infor
 Syspro
 Abas Business Software
 Oracle E-Business Suite

External links 
 Advanced Manufacturing Software's Official Site
 I.B.I.S. Inc. Web Site

Microsoft Dynamics
Production and manufacturing software
Accounting software